Alexander Gardner (April 28, 1861 – June 18, 1926) was a Canadian Major League Baseball catcher who played one game for the Washington Nationals of the American Association in 1884.

Gardner started his only game on May 10, 1884 and caught Ed Trumbull, who was also making his first major league start, in a matchup against the New York Metropolitans. At the plate, Gardner recorded no hits in three at bats. He also played poorly in the field, committing six errors and allowing six passed balls. Some sources credit him with 12 passed balls, which would be an all-time major league record. Washington lost the game, which was stopped after only seven innings, by a score of 11-3.

References

External links 

1861 births
1926 deaths
19th-century baseball players
19th-century Canadian people (post-Confederation)
Baseball players from Toronto
Canadian expatriate baseball players in the United States
Canadian people of German descent
Major League Baseball catchers
Major League Baseball players from Canada
Washington Nationals (AA) players